Alex Close (26 November 1921 in–21 October 2008) was a Belgian road bicycle racer. He finished fourth in the 1953 Tour de France and seventh in the 1952 Tour de France. He also won the Tour of Belgium in 1955 and the Critérium du Dauphiné Libéré in 1956.

Major results

1949
 4th Overall Volta a Catalunya
1951
 1st Stage 1 Tour de Luxembourg
 8th GP Stad Zottegem
1952
 7th Overall Tour de France
 8th Overall Tour de Luxembourg
1st Stage 3
1953
 1st Stage 5 Tour of Belgium
 2nd Overall Tour de Luxembourg
 4th Overall Tour de France
1954
 1st Stage 4b Tour of Belgium
 9th Overall Critérium du Dauphiné Libéré
1955
 1st  Overall Tour of Belgium
1st Stage 1
 5th Overall Tour de Luxembourg
 9th Overall Tour de France
1956
 1st  Overall Critérium du Dauphiné Libéré
1st Stage 8
 1st Hoeilaart–Diest–Hoeilaart
 3rd Liège–Bastogne–Liège
 7th Overall Tour of Belgium
1957
 8th Overall Tour of Belgium
1958
 9th Overall Critérium du Dauphiné Libéré
 9th Paris–Brussels

References

External links
 

Belgian male cyclists
1921 births
2008 deaths
Cyclists from Namur (province)
People from Sambreville
20th-century Belgian people